Malakoff is a suburban commune in the Hauts-de-Seine department southwest of Paris, France. Located  from the centre of the city, it had a population of 30,286 in 2016. The European Organisation for Civil Aviation Equipment (EUROCAE) is based in Malakoff.

History

The commune of Malakoff was created on 8 November 1883 by detaching its territory from the commune of Vanves. Its name was taken from an inn sign À la Tour de Malakoff ("At the Malakoff Tower"); the inn was so named in 1855 to commemorate the Battle of Malakoff, fought during the Crimean War.

Population

Transport
Malakoff is served by two stations on Paris Métro Line 13: Malakoff – Plateau de Vanves and Malakoff – Rue Étienne Dolet.

Malakoff is also served by the Gare de Vanves-Malakoff station on the Transilien Paris – Montparnasse suburban rail line. This station is located on the border between the commune of Malakoff and the commune of Vanves, on the Vanves side.

Education
Public primary schools:
 Eight public preschools (maternelles): Georges-Cogniot, Fernand-Léger, Jean-Jaurès, Guy-Môquet, Paul-Bert, Paul-Vaillant-Couturier, Paul-Langevin, Henri-Barbusse
 Seven public elementary schools: Georges-Cogniot, Fernand-Léger, Jean-Jaurès, Guy-Môquet, Paul-Bert, Paul-Langevin, Henri-Barbusse

Public secondary schools:
 Junior high schools: Collège Paul-Bert and Collège Henri-Wallon
 Senior high school: Lycée professionnel Louis-Girard

There is a private school, École privée Notre-Dame-de-France.

Post-secondary
 ENSAE ParisTech

Notable residents
Christian Boltanski, sculptor, photographer, painter and film maker, lives and works in Malakoff
Charles Bourseul (1829–1912), scientist, a pioneer in development of the telephone, lived at 62 Rue d'Arcueil (renamed Rue Paul Vaillant-Couturier).
Sophie Calle, artist, lives and works in Malakoff.
Eugène Christophe (1885–1970), cyclist, winner of the Milan-San Remo race and first wearer of the yellow jersey in the Tour de France.
Gaëtan Gatian de Clérambault (1872–1934), was a psychiatrist, an ethnologist, and a photographer. Lived in a fine villa on Rue Vincent Moris.
Pierre Curie (1859–1906) and Marie Curie (1867–1934) rented a house on Rue du Marché  (renamed Rue Gabriel-Crié). They used a shed on the property for their radium experiments (1900 to 1904).
Serge Danot (1931-1990), director and animator, creator of Le Manège enchanté
Louis de Grandmaison, painter, lived in Malakoff.
Edmond Lachenal, (1855–1948), potter who opened his first pottery works (from 1880 to 1887) in the city.
Henri Désiré Landru (1869-1922), notorious serial killer, ran a car repair shop on Avenue de Châtillon (renamed Avenue Pierre Brossolette) in the 1910s.
Roger Legris (1898–1981), stage and film actor. 
Annette Messager, artist, lives and works in Malakoff.
Louise Michel (1830-1905), militant anarchist, feminist, important figure in the Paris Commune
Pablo Reinoso, artist and designer, lives in Malakoff.
Henri Rousseau, called "The Customs Agent", (1844–1910), painter, took his nickname from the fact that his full-time job was as a Paris customs agent (the octroi) at the Porte de Vanves in Malakoff.
Sanyu (1901–1966), painter, lived from 1928 to 1931 in Malakoff on Rue Jean-Jacques Rousseau.
Francesca Solleville, singer, lives in Malakoff.
Sam Szafran (1934–2019), artist, lived and worked in Malakoff

See also

Communes of the Hauts-de-Seine department

References

External links

Official website (in French)

 
Communes of Hauts-de-Seine
Populated places established in 1883